United States v. Alvarez, 567 U.S. 709 (2012), is a landmark decision in which the Supreme Court of the United States ruled that the Stolen Valor Act of 2005 was unconstitutional. The Stolen Valor Act of 2005 was a federal law that criminalized false statements about having a military medal. It had been passed by Congress as an effort to stem instances where people falsely claimed to have earned the medal in an attempt to protect the valor of legitimate recipients. A 6–3 majority of the Supreme Court agreed that the law was unconstitutional and violated the free speech protections under the First Amendment. Despite reaffirming the opinion that was previously issued by the Ninth Circuit, it could not agree on a single rationale. Four justices concluded that a statement's falsity is not enough, by itself, to exclude speech from First Amendment protection. Another two justices concluded that while false statements were entitled to some protection, the Stolen Valor Act of 2005 was invalid because it could have achieved its objectives in less restrictive ways.

Veterans organizations and politicians reacted negatively. Several months after the decision, both chambers of Congress passed new versions of the Stolen Valor Act of 2005 based on the suggestions in the Court's opinion. Despite the Supreme Court having struck down the conviction under the Act, Alvarez remained in prison for fraud on other matters.

Background

Stolen Valor Act of 2005
President George W. Bush signed the Stolen Valor Act of 2005 (18 U.S.C. § 704) into law on December 20, 2006. The Act broadens previous provisions addressing the unauthorized wear, manufacture, or sale of any military decorations and medals by making it a misdemeanor to falsely represent oneself as having received any U.S. military decoration or medal. If convicted, defendants may be imprisoned for up to six months, unless the decoration lied about is the Medal of Honor, in which case imprisonment could be up to one year. Proponents in Congress argued that the law was passed to prevent imposters from "stealing the valor" of soldiers returning from engagements in Iraq and Afghanistan.

Alvarez's statements
In 2007, at a Three Valley Water District Board meeting in Claremont, California, new member Xavier Alvarez introduced himself by saying, "I'm a retired Marine of 25 years. I retired in the year 2001. Back in 1987, I was awarded the Congressional Medal of Honor. I got wounded many times by the same guy."

As this statement was not true, Alvarez was indicted for violating the Stolen Valor Act of 2005. The United States District Court for the Central District of California, the place where the trial was to occur, rejected Alvarez's claim that the act was unconstitutional. This decision was reversed by a three-judge panel of the United States Court of Appeals for the Ninth Circuit which held the law invalid.

The government appealed the Ninth Circuit's decision, which was subsequently granted by the Supreme Court in 2011.

Supreme Court oral arguments
The Supreme Court heard oral argument on February 22, 2012. Donald Verrilli, Jr., Solicitor General of the United States, appeared on behalf of the United States. Jonathan D. Libby, Deputy Federal Public Defender, appeared on behalf of Alvarez.

Verrilli spoke first; he began by explaining that military honors touch on the core values of the armed forces, and the Stolen Valor Act simply aims to protect those core values. Almost immediately Justice Sonia Sotomayor asked Verrilli a hypothetical:

 Verrilli responded by suggesting that such an act would be covered by the Act only if it were "reasonably understood by the audience as a statement of fact or as an exercise in political theater."

The questions during Verrilli's argument focused on the lack of injury caused by false claims of military honors. In nearly all the cases that the United States cited to support the proposition that there is no First Amendment value in falsity, the Court had addressed a false statement that harmed another, such as a defamatory statement. Relying on these cases, Verrilli stated, "[T]his Court has said in numerous contexts, numerous contexts, that the calculated factual falsehood has no First Amendment value for its own sake." Justice Anthony Kennedy immediately retorted:

Libby opened the defense argument by emphasizing that the First Amendment is intended to protect personal autonomy. In response to several questions, Libby played on the Court's discontent with the apparent lack of harm by stating that there is value in falsity "so long as it doesn't cause imminent harm to another person or imminent harm to a government function."

Libby stumbled in the Court's estimation, however, when he conceded that the Act did not chill any truthful speech. In response, Justice Kagan stated, "So, boy, I mean, that's a big concession, Mr. Libby. Then you're saying, you can only win this case if this Court decides that the Gertz statement was a kind of overstatement, an exaggeration, puffery."

Supreme Court's decision
On June 28, 2012, a divided Court held that the prohibition against making false statements of having been awarded a military medal under the Stolen Valor Act of 2005 violated the First Amendment. However, the six justices in the majority could not agree on a single rationale for the decision. Since the Stolen Valor Act of 2005 did not contain a provision of severability, the Supreme Court was ultimately free to overturn the Act in its entirety.

Kennedy's plurality opinion
Justice Anthony Kennedy, writing for a plurality consisting of himself, Chief Justice John Roberts, Justice Ruth Bader Ginsburg, and Justice Sonia Sotomayor, wrote that false statements are not, by the sole reason of their falsity, excluded from First Amendment protection. "The Court has never endorsed the categorical rule the Government advances," Kennedy wrote. "Our prior decisions have not confronted a measure, like the Stolen Valor Act [of 2005], that targets falsity and nothing more." Even though there are several examples of the use of penalizing false speech (like perjury), Kennedy argued that "[t]he Government has not demonstrated that false statements generally should constitute a new category of unprotected speech..."

The plurality opinion also expressed the wide applicability of the Stolen Valor Act of 2005. "The Act by its plain terms," Kennedy wrote, "applies to a false statement made at any time, in any place, to any person". Such breadth means that the law is "sweeping... [the] reach of the statute puts it in conflict with the First Amendment... the statute would apply with equal force to personal, whispered conversations within a home."

When balanced against the Government's need to protect the value of the medal, the plurality said that "the link between the Government's interest in protecting the integrity of the military honors system and the Act's restriction on the false claims of liars like respondent has not been shown." Additionally, Kennedy wrote that 'counter-speech' was a sufficient solution to the problem: "It is a fair assumption that any true holders of the Medal who had heard of Alvarez's false claims would have been fully vindicated by the community's expression of outrage... Truth needs neither handcuffs nor a badge for its vindication."

Wrote Kennedy: "Permitting the government to decree this speech to be a criminal offense, whether shouted from the rooftops or made in a barely audible whisper, would endorse government authority to compile a list of subjects about which false statements are punishable. That governmental power has no clear limiting principle. Our constitutional tradition stands against the idea that we need Oceania’s Ministry of Truth," invoking George Orwell's novel 1984.

Breyer's concurrence
Justice Stephen Breyer, joined by Justice Elena Kagan, agreed that the Stolen Valor Act of 2005 was unconstitutional, but on entirely different grounds. Breyer based his finding not on a strict scrutiny test that the plurality had used, but on a "proportionality" or "intermediate scrutiny test". This test examines "whether the statute works speech-related harm that is out of proportion to its justifications." After holding that Congress could create a database of those who had won the medal, among other alternatives to the existing law, Breyer said that there were lesser restrictive means to achieve the government's interest.

Alito's dissent
Justice Samuel Alito, joined by Justices Antonin Scalia and Clarence Thomas, dissented from the Court's decision striking down the Act. For Alito, the ruling had "[broken] sharply from a long line of cases recognizing that the right to free speech does not protect false factual statements that inflict real harm and serve no legitimate interest." "The Stolen Valor Act [of 2005]," Alito wrote, "represents the judgment of the people's elected representatives that false statements about military awards are very different from false statements about civilian awards... [the Act] is a narrow law enacted to address an important problem, and it presents no threat to freedom of expression."

Subsequent developments

Reaction

The decision received praise on constitutional grounds from across the political spectrum. The First Amendment Center called the decision "a victory for free speech and common sense."

Several veterans organizations leaders were dismayed by the decision. A spokesperson for the Veterans of Foreign Wars said "Despite the ruling, the VFW will continue to challenge far-fetched stories, and to publicize these false heroes to the broadest extent possible as a deterrent to others.” Harold A. Fritz, a recipient of the medal from the Vietnam War, agreed with the VFW that "It’s more than just a piece of metal suspended on a piece of cloth on a pin. . . . And people who abuse that . . . need to be penalized." Proponents of the Stolen Valor Act promised to bring forward more limited legislation in the future.

The American Legion expressed hope that a narrower law would survive constitutional scrutiny.  "We felt good about portions of the decision which suggest that a more narrowly tailored bill which incorporates traditional fraud elements would be upheld," said Fang Wong, national commander of the American Legion.

Alvarez's attorney praised the decision, saying "The First Amendment protects a lot of what we as Americans get to say...The government doesn't get to decide what we can and cannot say.”

Aftermath

Alvarez remained in legal trouble due to allegations that he defrauded the government by falsely receiving health insurance benefits. He was convicted of misappropriation of public funds, grand theft, and insurance fraud in 2009 and sentenced to five years in state prison, and was discharged in March 2012 from Calipatria State Prison.

Revised Law
In 2012, an effort was initiated to revise the Stolen Valor Act of 2005 to comply with the decision from the Supreme Court. The result was the Stolen Valor Act of 2013. This revised version of the law was passed by Congress and it was eventually signed by President Barack Obama. In addition to a wrongful claim of receiving one of the listed military awards, intent to gain some benefit or something of value by fraud was required.

See also
 List of United States Supreme Court cases involving the First Amendment

Notes

References

External links 
 

United States Supreme Court cases
United States Supreme Court cases of the Roberts Court
Overbreadth case law
Medal of Honor
2012 in United States case law